Beaumaris was a parliamentary borough in Anglesey, which returned one Member of Parliament (MP) to the House of Commons of the Parliament of England from 1553, then to the Parliament of Great Britain from 1707 to 1800 and to the Parliament of the United Kingdom from 1801 to 1885, when the constituency was abolished. After 1832, the constituency was usually known as the Beaumaris District of Boroughs or simply the Beaumaris Boroughs.

History
As elsewhere in Wales, the Laws in Wales Acts 1535 and 1542 provided Anglesey with two members of parliament, one representing the county and the other representing a borough constituency named after the county town but including other "contributory boroughs" who were jointly responsible for providing for the upkeep of the MP and, in return, were granted a say in his election. However, at this period two towns, Beaumaris and Newborough, were disputing the right to be considered Anglesey's county town: under Henry VIII, Newborough was the assize town, but early in the reign of Edward VI (1547–1553) this function was transferred to Beaumaris. The new constituency was designated as Beaumaris, with Newborough as its only contributory borough, and first returned an MP in 1542; but at the same time as the assize was transferred, Newborough was also relieved of the obligation to contribute to the wages of the MP for Beaumaris which, under the terms of the relevant statute, also extinguished its right to vote in his election. Porritt, the early 20th century expert on the history of the Unreformed House of Commons, concludes that "the probability is that Newborough broke the connection in a fit of ill-humour" rather than that it was contrived by Beaumaris; but within a few decades, as the desirability of being directly represented in Parliament became more widely recognised, Newborough was trying unsuccessfully to regain its former status. On several occasions until the early 18th century, Newborough's inhabitants attempted to vote, but had their votes refused by the returning officer and his decision was upheld by Parliament whenever they petitioned in objection.

The franchise was further restricted in 1562, when Elizabeth I granted Beaumaris a new municipal charter, which reserved the right to vote in parliamentary elections to members of the town corporation. Thereafter until 1832, Beaumaris was a closed "corporation borough" of a type common in England but unknown elsewhere in Wales; its only voters were the mayor, two bailiffs and 21 "capital burgesses", and since they had the sole right to fill any vacancies arising in their number their power was entirely self-perpetuating, making the constituency a completely safe pocket borough. For the best part of two centuries before the Great Reform Act of 1832, the nomination was in the hands of the Bulkeley family of Baron Hill, and the elections were never contested.

By 1831, the borough of Beaumaris had a population of 2,497 (though, still, only 24 voters). The Reform Act extended the franchise, and also added three contributory boroughs – Amlwch, Holyhead and Llangefni. This raised the population of the revised Beaumaris Boroughs constituency to 8,547, though the number of qualified voters on the register in 1832 was only 329. This was still in practice a pocket borough, and the first contested election did not take place until the further extension of the franchise by the Second Reform Act, which brought the electorate up to almost 2,000 in the elections from 1868.

The constituency was abolished in the redistribution of seats in 1885, being merged into the Anglesey county constituency.

Members of Parliament

1542–1640

Members for Newborough

Members for Beaumaris

1640–1885

Election results

Elections in the 1830s

Williams' death caused a by-election.

Elections in the 1840s

Elections in the 1850s

Elections in the 1860s

Elections in the 1870s

Elections in the 1880s

References

Sources

F W S Craig, British Parliamentary Election Results 1832–1885 (2nd edition, Aldershot: Parliamentary Research Services, 1989)

 J Holladay Philbin, Parliamentary Representation 1832 – England and Wales (New Haven: Yale University Press, 1965)
 Edward Porritt and Annie G Porritt, The Unreformed House of Commons (Cambridge University Press, 1903)
 Robert Walcott, English Politics in the Early Eighteenth Century (Oxford: Oxford University Press, 1956)
 

Historic parliamentary constituencies in North Wales
Constituencies of the Parliament of the United Kingdom established in 1536
Constituencies of the Parliament of the United Kingdom disestablished in 1885
Beaumaris